Buffalo Township, Kansas may refer to:

 Buffalo Township, Barton County, Kansas
 Buffalo Township, Jewell County, Kansas
 Buffalo Township, Cloud County, Kansas

See also 
 List of Kansas townships
 Buffalo Township (disambiguation)

Kansas township disambiguation pages